The men's 500 m  at the 2011 KNSB Dutch Single Distance Championships in Heerenveen took place at Thialf on Friday 5 November 2010. 24 athletes participated in the contest. The championship consisted of 2 times a 500 m. Every rider skated started once in the inner and once outer lane. Five speed skaters qualified for the 500 m at the 2010–11 ISU Speed Skating World Cup. Jan Smeekens was the title holder.

Results

Draw 1st 500 m

Source: KNSB.nl Draw 1st 500 m

Results 1st 500 m

Notes:
DQ = disqualified

Source: Schaatsupdate.nl

Draw 2nd 500 m

Source: KNSB.nl Draw 2nd 500 m

Results 2nd 500 m

Notes:
DQ = disqualified
DNF = did not finish

Source: Schaatsupdate.nl

Final results

References 

Dutch Single Distance Championships
Single Distance Championships
2011 Single Distance